The Gibson J-200 (formerly the Gibson SJ-200 or Super Jumbo 200), is an acoustic guitar model produced by the Gibson Guitar Corporation.

History
Gibson entered into production of this model in 1937 as its top-of-the-line flat top guitar, initially called the Super Jumbo, changing the name in 1939 to the Super Jumbo 200. 
It replaced the Gibson Advanced Jumbo.
It was made at the Gibson Factory in Kalamazoo, Michigan. The SJ-200 was named for its super-large 16 7/8" flat top body, with a double-braced red spruce top, rosewood back and sides, and sunburst finish. In 1947 the materials used for the guitar changed to maple back and sides. Gibson changed the name to the J-200 in 1955. Due to the weak post-depression economy and wartime austerity, demand for this high-end guitar was very limited and production quantities were small. Early models made from rosewood are highly prized by collectors.  Adjustments to bridge design and bracing starting in the early 1960s lead to dramatically changing tone and projection of the instrument.  The models built from 1947–1957 are considered widely known as powerful, lush, and great sounding guitars for strumming and song writing.  By the late 1980s when the Bozeman shop opened up these instruments were reverted back to the original sought after designs of the 1930s to 1950s.

Current models
Gibson currently makes many variations of the J-200.

The SJ-200 Studio is the lowest model in the line, featuring walnut rather than maple back and sides, chrome hardware, a plain  pickguard, natural finish and no fingerboard binding, but it retains the inlays and electronics of the SJ-200 Standard. It has at times been discontinued.

The SJ-200 Standard is available in sunburst and natural, featuring LR Baggs electronics, gold hardware, Grover tuners, figured maple back and sides and a three-piece laminate neck (maple/rosewood/maple). It also has a rosewood fingerboard and bridge, an engraved pickguard, and mother-of-pearl crown inlays.

The SJ-200 Custom is a high-end model, featuring rosewood back and sides (like the original SJ-200s from the 1930s), a rosewood fingerboard and bridge, gold hardware, Grover Imperial tuners, LR Baggs electronics, an upgraded case, the same three-piece neck as the Standard and Studio, abalone inlays, an engraved pickguard, an older, script-style Gibson logo, and a 'four ribbon bridge' instead of the Standard's 'two ribbon' bridge.

Two replicas of old models one the Prewar SJ-200 in Rosewood and the other a replica of a 1957 from Gibson's Historic Collection of guitars.

Along with these three are two reissues, the True Vintage (based on the 1950s construction) and the Western Classic Prewar 200, which is similar in specifications to the original early models (rosewood back and sides, ebony fingerboard, block inlays). Gibson also does limited run models, such as the J-200 Koa, the J-200 Trophy, and Montana Gold.

Gibson's brand, Epiphone, produces a more affordable version of the J-200. As of 2020, Epiphone released a new "Inspired by Gibson" model of the J-200, which brings the character and specifications of the Gibson model to a wider market. It currently retails for $899 and comes in two colors - Aged Vintage Sunburst and Aged Natural Antique.

References

Further reading

External links

 Gibson J-200
 20 Essential Facts About the Gibson J-200

J200
Products introduced in 1937
1937 in music
The Beatles' musical instruments